Choqa Mushan (also Romanized as Choqā Mūshān, Chaqamīshān, Chaqā Mūshān, and Choghā Mūshān) is a village in Japelaq-e Gharbi Rural District, Japelaq District, Azna County, Lorestan Province, Iran. At the 2006 census, its population was 68, in 13 families.

References 

Towns and villages in Azna County